The 2015–16 Denver Nuggets season was the 40th season of the franchise in the National Basketball Association (NBA). The season saw the team change their uniforms.

Draft

Pre-season

|- style="background:#fbb;"
| 1
| October 2
| @ L.A. Clippers
| 96–103
| Joffrey Lauvergne (16)
| Will Barton (13)
| Jameer Nelson (7)
| Staples Center14,245
| 0–1
|- style="background:#bfb;"
| 2
| October 6
| @ Dallas
| 96–86
| Emmanuel Mudiay (17)
| Joffrey Lauvergne (14)
| Gallinari, Mudiay (5)
| American Airlines Center17,038
| 1–1
|- style="background:#bfb;"
| 3
| October 8
| Chicago
| 112–94
| Joffrey Lauvergne (18)
| Joffrey Lauvergne (8)
| Mudiay, Nelson (7)
| Coors Events Center5,305
| 2–1
|- style="background:#bfb;"
| 4
| October 13
| @ Golden State
| 114–103
| Kenneth Faried (22)
| Kenneth Faried (12)
| Emmanuel Mudiay (9)
| Oracle Arena19,596
| 3–1
|- style="background:#bfb;"
| 5
| October 16
| Phoenix
| 106–81
| Barton, Jokic (19)
| Wilson Chandler (19)
| Jameer Nelson (12)
| Pepsi Center8,552
| 4–1
|- style="background:#fbb;"
| 6
| October 18
| @ Oklahoma City
| 98–111
| Emmanuel Mudiay (22)
| Lauvergne, Mudiay (5)
| Erick Green (4)
| Chesapeake Energy ArenaN/A
| 4–2
|- style="background:#fbb;"
| 7
| October 22
| @ Utah
| 78–98
| Danilo Gallinari (19)
| Nikola Jokić (9)
| Erick Green (4)
| EnergySolutions Arena17,083
| 4–3

Regular season game log

|- bgcolor=#bbffbb
| 1
| October 28
| @ Houston
| 
| Danilo Gallinari (23)
| Kenneth Faried (9)
| Emmanuel Mudiay (9)
| Toyota Center18,240
| 1–0
|- bgcolor=#ffbbbb
| 2
| October 30
| Minnesota
| 
| Emmanuel Mudiay (15)
| Kenneth Faried (15)
| Jameer Nelson (4)
| Pepsi Center17,660
| 1–1

|- bgcolor=#ffbbbb
| 3
| November 1
| @ Oklahoma City
| 
| Barton, Gallinari (15)
| Joffrey Lauvergne (7)
| Jameer Nelson (7)
| Chesapeake Energy Arena18,203
| 1–2
|- bgcolor=bbffbb
| 4
| November 3
| @ L.A. Lakers
| 
| Kenneth Faried (28)
| Kenneth Faried (15)
| Emmanuel Mudiay (10)
| Staples Center18,997
| 2–2
|- bgcolor=ffbbbb
| 5
| November 5
| Utah
| 
| Danilo Gallinari (18)
| Kenneth Faried (10)
| Jameer Nelson (4)
| Pepsi Center9,906
| 2–3
|- bgcolor=ffbbbb
| 6
| November 6
| @ Golden State
| 
| Danilo Gallinari (25)
| Kenneth Faried (11)
| Barton, Nelson, Mudiay (5)
| Oracle Arena19,596
| 2–4
|- bgcolor=bbffbb
| 7
| November 9
| Portland
| 
| JJ Hickson (19)
| JJ Hickson (13)
| Emmanuel Mudiay (5)
| Pepsi Center9,153
| 3–4
|- bgcolor=bbffbb
| 8
| November 11
| Milwaukee
| 
| Danilo Gallinari (25)
| Kenneth Faried (9)
| Emmanuel Mudiay (11)
| Pepsi Center9,403
| 4–4
|- bgcolor=bbffbb
| 9
| November 13
| Houston
| 
| Danilo Gallinari (27)
| Kenneth Faried (11)
| Emmanuel Mudiay (11)
| Pepsi Center16,113
| 5–4
|- bgcolor=ffbbbb
| 10
| November 14
| @ Phoenix
| 
| Will Barton (19)
| Will Barton (12)
| Will Barton (4)
| Talking Stick Resort Arena16,722
| 5–5
|- bgcolor=bbffbb
| 11
| November 17
| @ New Orleans
| 
| Danilo Gallinari (32)
| Danilo Gallinari (8)
| Gallinari, Mudiay (8)
| Smoothie King Center17,269
| 6–5
|- bgcolor=ffbbbb
| 12
| November 18
| @ San Antonio
| 
| Nikola Jokić (23)
| Nikola Jokić (12)
| Emmanuel Mudiay (7)
| AT&T Center18,418
| 6–6
|- bgcolor=ffbbbb
| 13
| November 20
| Phoenix
| 
| Emmanuel Mudiay (23)
| Danilo Gallinari (10)
| Jameer Nelson (7)
| Pepsi Center12,264
| 6–7
|- bgcolor=ffbbbb
| 14
| November 22
| Golden State
| 
| Darrell Arthur (21)
| Nikola Jokić (11)
| Emmanuel Mudiay (8)
| Pepsi Center17,689
| 6–8
|- bgcolor=ffbbbb
| 15
| November 24
| L.A. Clippers
| 
| Danilo Gallinari (20)
| Danilo Gallinari (18)
| Emmanuel Mudiay (4)
| Pepsi Center13,257
| 6–9
|- bgcolor=ffbbbb
| 16
| November 27
| San Antonio
| 
| Danilo Gallinari (16)
| Danilo Gallinari (10)
| Harris, Foye, Mudiay (3)
| Pepsi Center17,121
| 6–10
|- bgcolor=ffbbbb
| 17
| November 28
| @ Dallas
| 
| Darrell Arthur (16)
| Danilo Gallinari (9)
| Barton, Mudiay (4)
| AmericanAirlines Center20,339
| 6–11
|- bgcolor=ffbbbb
| 18
| November 30
| @ Milwaukee
| 
| Danilo Gallinari (13)
| Faried, Foye (7)
| Mudiay, Nelson (4)
| BMO Harris Bradley Center10,187
| 6–12

|- bgcolor=ffbbbb
| 19
| December 2
| @ Chicago
| 
| Will Barton (16)
| Kenneth Faried (9)
| Emmanuel Mudiay (7)
| United Center21,349
| 6–13
|- bgcolor=bbffbb
| 20
| December 3
| @ Toronto
| 
| Will Barton (22)
| Joffrey Lauvergne (10)
| Emmanuel Mudiay (9)
| Air Canada Centre19,800
| 7–13
|- bgcolor=bbffbb
| 21
| December 5
| @ Philadelphia
| 
| Danilo Gallinari (24)
| Barton, Faried (9)
| Mudiay, Miller (6)
| Wells Fargo Center15,677
| 8-13
|- bgcolor=ffbbbb
| 22
| December 8
| Orlando
| 
| Will Barton (23)
| Faried, Hickson (11)
| Jameer Nelson (5)
| Pepsi Center13,925
| 8–14
|- bgcolor=bbffbb
| 23
| December 11
| Minnesota
| 
| Danilo Gallinari (23)
| Kenneth Faried (12)
| Jameer Nelson (7)
| Pepsi Center12,533
| 9–14
|- bgcolor=bbffbb
| 24
| December 14
| Houston
| 
| Will Barton (23)
| Joffrey Lauvergne (11)
| Gallinari, Nelson (7)
| Pepsi Center12,022
| 10–14
|- bgcolor=bbffbb
| 25
| December 15
| @ Minnesota
| 
| Faried, Foye (19)
| Kenneth Faried (10)
| Gallinari, Barton (5)
| Target Center11,323
| 11–14
|- bgcolor=ffbbbb
| 26
| December 18
| @ Utah
| 
| Will Barton (16)
| Joffrey Lauvergne (13)
| Jameer Nelson (6)
| Vivint Smart Home Arena19,169
| 11–15
|- bgcolor=ffbbbb
| 27
| December 20
| New Orleans
| 
| Will Barton (32)
| Will Barton (10)
| Barton, Nelson (6)
| Pepsi Center13,857
| 11–16
|- bgcolor=ffbbbb
| 28
| December 22
| L.A. Lakers
| 
| Will Barton (25)
| Nikola Jokić (10)
| Jameer Nelson (7)
| Pepsi Center19,124
| 11–17
|- bgcolor=bbffbb
| 29
| December 23
| @ Phoenix
| 
| Randy Foye (31)
| Darrell Arthur (10)
| Randy Foye (6)
| Talking Stick Resort Arena17,034
| 12–17
|- bgcolor=ffbbbb
| 30
| December 26
| @ San Antonio
| 
| Nikola Jokić (22)
| Nikola Jokić (7)
| Harris, Jokić (5)
| AT&T Center18,420
| 12–18
|- bgcolor=ffbbbb
| 31
| December 27
| @ Oklahoma City
| 
| Kenneth Faried (25)
| Kenneth Faried (11)
| Barton, Nelson (5)
| Chesapeake Energy Arena18,203
| 12–19
|- bgcolor=ffbbbb
| 32
| December 29
| Cleveland
| 
| Will Barton (29)
| Kenneth Faried (8)
| Jameer Nelson (8)
| Pepsi Center17,523
| 12–20
|- bgcolor=ffbbbb
| 33
| December 30
| @ Portland
| 
| Will Barton (31)
| Kenneth Faried (12)
| Jameer Nelson (8)
| Moda Center19,393
| 12–21

|- bgcolor=ffbbbb
| 34
| January 2
| @ Golden State
| 
| Danilo Gallinari (24)
| Will Barton (13)
| Will Barton, Nelson (7)
| Oracle Arena19,596
| 12–22
|- bgcolor=ffbbbb
| 35
| January 3
| Portland
| 
| Danilo Gallinari (29)
| Nikola Jokić (10)
| Jameer Nelson (7)
| Pepsi Center11,883
| 12–23
|- bgcolor=bbffbb
| 36
| January 6
| @ Minnesota
| 
| Danilo Gallinari (20)
| Jusuf Nurkić (10)
| Darrell Arthur (5)
| Target Center12,059
| 13–23
|- bgcolor=ffbbbb
| 37
| January 8
| @ Memphis
| 
| Danilo Gallinari (29)
| Arthur, Barton (9)
| Jameer Nelson (9)
| FedExForum17,499
| 13–24
|- bgcolor=bbffbb
| 38
| January 10
| Charlotte
| 
| Danilo Gallinari (27)
| Will Barton (8)
| Nikola Jokić (9)
| Pepsi Center11,343
| 14–24
|- bgcolor=bbffbb
| 39
| January 13
| Golden State
| 
| Danilo Gallinari (28)
| Darrell Arthur (11)
| Jameer Nelson (9)
| Pepsi Center18,004
| 15–24
|- bgcolor=ffbbbb
| 40
| January 15
| Miami
| 
| Darrell Arthur (18)
| Arthur, Barton (8)
| Nikola Jokić (5)
| Pepsi Center15,406
| 15–25
|- bgcolor=bbffbb
| 41
| January 17
| Indiana
| 
| Danilo Gallinari (23)
| Kenneth Faried (9)
| Foye, Mudiay (6)
| Pepsi Center11,104
| 16–25
|- bgcolor=ffbbbb
| 42
| January 19
| Oklahoma City
| 
| Danilo Gallinari (27)
| Kenneth Faried (15)
| Emmanuel Mudiay (9)
| Pepsi Center12,844
| 16–26
|- bgcolor=ffbbbb
| 43
| January 21
| Memphis
| 
| Gallinari, Faried (17)
| Kenneth Faried (12)
| Emmanuel Mudiay (8)
| Pepsi Center16,140
| 16–27
|- bgcolor=bbffbb
| 44
| January 23
| Detroit
| 
| Danilo Gallinari (30)
| Danilo Gallinari (6)
| Emmanuel Mudiay (4)
| Pepsi Center14,646
| 17–27
|- bgcolor=ffbbbb
| 45
| January 25
| Atlanta
| 
| Will Barton (21)
| Nikola Jokić (10)
| Emmanuel Mudiay (6)
| Pepsi Center10,280
| 17–28
|- bgcolor=ffbbbb
| 46
| January 27
| @ Boston
| 
| Barton, Gallinari (23)
| Kenneth Faried (15)
| Barton, Faried, Jokić, Mudiay (4)
| TD Garden18,108
| 17–29
|- bgcolor=bbffbb
| 47
| January 28
| @ Washington
| 
| Danilo Gallinari (26)
| Nikola Jokić (10)
| Danilo Gallinari (6)
| Verizon Center15,146
| 18–29
|- bgcolor=ffbbbb
| 48
| January 30
| @ Indiana
| 
| Danilo Gallinari (23)
| Kenneth Faried (12)
| Emmanuel Mudiay (8)
| Bankers Life Fieldhouse18,165
| 18–30

|- bgcolor=bbffbb
| 49
| February 1
| Toronto
| 
| Nikola Jokić (27)
| Nikola Jokić (14)
| Emmanuel Mudiay (8)
| Pepsi Center10,007
| 19–30
|- bgcolor=ffbbbb
| 50
| February 3
| @ Utah
| 
| Danilo Gallinari (24)
| Will Barton (10)
| Emmanuel Mudiay (6)
| Vivint Smart Home Arena19,461
| 19–31
|- bgcolor=bbffbb
| 51
| February 5
| Chicago
| 
| Danilo Gallinari (33)
| Nikola Jokić (12)
| Randy Foye (6)
| Pepsi Center19,155
| 20–31
|- bgcolor=bbffbb
| 52
| February 7
| @ New York
| 
| Barton, Gallinari (19)
| Will Barton (11)
| Emmanuel Mudiay (9)
| Madison Square Garden19,812
| 21–31
|- bgcolor=ffbbbb
| 53
| February 8
| @ Brooklyn
| 
| Danilo Gallinari (24)
| Kenneth Faried (13)
| Emmanuel Mudiay (8)
| Barclays Center13,043
| 21–32
|- bgcolor=bbffbb
| 54
| February 10
| @ Detroit
| 
| Will Barton (20)
| Jusuf Nurkić (11)
| Emmanuel Mudiay (6)
| The Palace of Auburn Hills19,971
| 22–32
|- align="center"
|colspan="9" bgcolor="#bbcaff"|All-Star Break
|- bgcolor=ffbbbb
| 55
| February 19
| @ Sacramento
| 
| Danilo Gallinari (27)
| Barton, Faried (9)
| D. J. Augustin (6)
| Sleep Train Arena17,317
| 22–33
|- bgcolor=ffbbbb
| 56
| February 21
| Boston
| 
| Nikola Jokić (23)
| Nikola Jokić (13)
| Augustin, Jokic (4)
| Pepsi Center16,065
| 22–34
|- bgcolor=ffbbbb
| 57
| February 23
| Sacramento
| 
| Will Barton (18)
| Nikola Jokić (13)
| Nikola Jokić (6)
| Pepsi Center15,721
| 22–35
|- bgcolor=bbffbb
| 58
| February 24
| @ L.A. Clippers
| 
| Kenneth Faried (21)
| Faried, Jokić (11)
| Emmanuel Mudiay (6)
| Staples Center19,060
| 23–35
|- bgcolor=ffbbbb
| 59
| February 26
| @ Dallas
| 
| Will Barton (22)
| Kenneth Faried (12)
| Emmanuel Mudiay (6)
| AmericanAirlines Center20,298
| 23–36
|- bgcolor=ffbbbb
| 60
| February 29
| Memphis
| 
| Kenneth Faried (16)
| Kenneth Faried (11)
| Emmanuel Mudiay (7)
| Pepsi Center10,324
| 23–37

|- bgcolor=bbffbb
| 61
| March 2
| L.A. Lakers
| 
| D. J. Augustin (26)
| Joffrey Lauvergne (10)
| Emmanuel Mudiay (7)
| Pepsi Center20,096
| 24–37
|- bgcolor=ffbbbb
| 62
| March 4
| Brooklyn
| 
| Emmanuel Mudiay (25)
| Nikola Jokić (12)
| Emmanuel Mudiay (7)
| Pepsi Center14,163
| 24–38
|- bgcolor=bbffbb
| 63
| March 6
| Dallas
| 
| Kenneth Faried (25)
| Kenneth Faried (20)
| Emmanuel Mudiay (8)
| Pepsi Center14,802
| 25–38
|- bgcolor=bbffbb
| 64
| March 8
| New York
| 
| Kenneth Faried (24)
| Kenneth Faried (10)
| D. J. Augustin (6)
| Pepsi Center13,305
| 26–38
|- bgcolor=bbffbb
| 65
| March 10
| Phoenix
| 
| Emmanuel Mudiay (30)
| Nikola Jokić (10)
| D. J. Augustin (6)
| Pepsi Center11,582
| 27–38
|- bgcolor=bbffbb
| 66
| March 12
| Washington
| 
| Arthur, Augustin, Harris, Jokić (17)
| Will Barton (10)
| D. J. Augustin (10)
| Pepsi Center13,213
| 28–38
|- bgcolor=ffbbbb
| 67
| March 14
| @ Miami
| 
| Emmanuel Mudiay (23)
| Kenneth Faried (11)
| Emmanuel Mudiay (10)
| American Airlines Arena19,744
| 28–39
|- bgcolor=ffbbbb
| 68
| March 15
| @ Orlando
| 
| Gary Harris (18)
| Joffrey Lauvergne (8)
| D. J. Augustin (8)
| Amway Center16,988
| 28–40
|- bgcolor=ffbbbb
| 69
| March 17
| @ Atlanta
| 
| D. J. Augustin (17)
| Nikola Jokić (7)
| D. J. Augustin (7)
| Philips Arena14,383
| 28–41
|- bgcolor=bbffbb
| 70
| March 19
| @ Charlotte
| 
| D. J. Augustin (24)
| Nikola Jokić (14)
| Jokić, Mudiay (4)
| Time Warner Cable Arena19,271
| 29–41
|- bgcolor=ffbbbb
| 71
| March 21
| @ Cleveland
| 
| Will Barton (27)
| Nikola Jokić (7)
| D. J. Augustin (5)
| Quicken Loans Arena20,562
| 29–42
|- bgcolor=bbffbb
| 72
| March 23
| Philadelphia
| 
| Emmanuel Mudiay (27)
| Emmanuel Mudiay (10)
| Augustin, Jokić (5)
| Pepsi Center10,684
| 30–42
|- bgcolor=bbffbb
| 73
| March 25
| @ L.A. Lakers
| 
| D. J. Augustin (20)
| Nikola Jokić (12)
| D. J. Augustin (8)
| Staples Center18,997
| 31–42
|- bgcolor=ffbbbb
| 74
| March 27
| @ L.A. Clippers
| 
| Nikola Jokić (19)
| Darrell Arthur (12)
| D. J. Augustin (10)
| Staples Center19,060
| 31–43
|- bgcolor=ffbbbb
| 75
| March 28
| Dallas
| 
| Will Barton (23)
| Kenneth Faried (11)
| Emmanuel Mudiay (7)
| Pepsi Center14,844
| 31–44
|- bgcolor=bbffbb
| 76
| March 30
| @ Memphis
| 
| Will Barton (25)
| Nikola Jokić (14)
| D. J. Augustin (5)
| FedExForum16,401
| 32–44
|- bgcolor=ffbbbb
| 77
| March 31
| @ New Orleans
| 
| Darrell Arthur (24)
| Kenneth Faried (12)
| D. J. Augustin (8)
| Smoothie King Center16,269
| 32–45

|- bgcolor=ffbbbb
| 78
| April 2
| Sacramento
| 
| Gary Harris (19)
| Nikola Jokić (13)
| Emmanuel Mudiay (6)
| Pepsi Center15,607
| 32–46
|- bgcolor=ffbbbb
| 79
| April 5
| Oklahoma City
| 
| Gary Harris (17)
| Joffrey Lauvergne (10)
| Gary Harris (5)
| Pepsi Center12,611
| 32–47
|- bgcolor=bbffbb
| 80
| April 8
| San Antonio
| 
| Jusuf Nurkić (21)
| Nikola Jokić (15)
| Emmanuel Mudiay (5)
| Pepsi Center16,347
| 33–47
|- bgcolor=ffbbbb
| 81
| April 10
| Utah
| 
| Mudiay, Jokić (19)
| Nikola Jokić (11)
| Emmanuel Mudiay (5)
| Pepsi Center16,172
| 33–48
|- bgcolor=ffbbbb
| 82
| April 13
| @ Portland
| 
| Emmanuel Mudiay (25)
| Nikola Jokić (14)
| Emmanuel Mudiay (6)
| Moda Center19,571
| 33–49

Player statistics

Regular season

|- align="center" bgcolor=""
| 
| 70 || 16 || 21.7 || .452 || .385 || .755 || 4.2 || 1.4 || .8 || .7 || 7.5
|- align="center" bgcolor=""
| 
| 28 || 0 || 23.5 || .445 || .411 || .819 || 1.9 || 4.7 || .9 || .1 || 11.6
|- align="center" bgcolor=""
| 
| style=|82 || 1 || 28.7 || .432 || .345 || .806 || 5.8 || 2.5 || .9 || .5 || 14.4
|- align="center" bgcolor=""
| 
| 67 || 64 || 25.3 || style=|.558 || style=|.500 || .613 || style=|8.7 || 1.2 || .5 || .9 || 12.5
|- align="center" bgcolor=""
| 
| 54 || 7 || 19.8 || .351 || .296 || .830 || 1.9 || 2.1 || .5 || .3 || 6.0
|- align="center" bgcolor=""
| 
| 53 || 53 || style=|34.7 || .410 || .364 || .868 || 5.3 || 2.5 || .8 || .4 || style=|19.5
|- align="center" bgcolor=""
| 
| 3 || 0 || 2.3 || .000 || .000 || .000 || .3 || .3 || .00 || .00 || .00
|- align="center" bgcolor=""
| 
| 76 || style=|76 || 32.1 || .469 || .354 || .820 || 2.9 || 1.9 || style=|1.3 || .2 || 12.3
|- align="center" bgcolor=""
| 
| 20 || 9 || 15.3 || .505 || .000 || .458 || 4.4 || .8 || .5 || .6 || 6.9
|- align="center" bgcolor=""
| 
| 80 || 55 || 21.7 || .512 || .333 || .811 || 7.0 || 2.4 || 1.0 || .6 || 10.0
|- align="center" bgcolor=""
| 
| 8 || 0 || 10.3 || .381 || .235 || .875 || .8 || .4 || .3 || .00 || 3.4
|- align="center" bgcolor=""
| 
| 59 || 15 || 17.6 || .513 || .245 || style=|.899 || 4.9 || .9 || .2 || .3 || 7.9
|- align="center" bgcolor=""
| 
| 47 || 2 || 7.9 || .355 || .365 || .000 || 1.1 || .9 || .3 || .1 || 1.3
|- align="center" bgcolor=""
| 
| 68 || 66 || 30.4 || .364 || .319 || .670 || 3.4 || style=|5.5 || 1.0 || .5 || 12.8
|- align="center" bgcolor=""
| 
| 39 || 15 || 26.6 || .368 || .299 || .857 || 2.9 || 4.9 || .6 || .1 || 7.7
|- align="center" bgcolor=""
| 
| 32 || 3 || 17.1 || .417 || .000 || .616 || 5.5 || 1.3 || .8 || style=|1.4 || 8.2
|- align="center" bgcolor=""
| 
| 26 || 6 || 11.3 || .364 || .313 || .643 || 1.5 || .6 || .5 || .2 || 2.6
|- align="center" bgcolor=""
| 
| 26 || 22 || 18.0 || .470 || .276 || .720 || 2.3 || .6 || .5 || .7 || 5.2
|- align="center" bgcolor=""
| 
| 21 || 0 || 14.5 || .357 || .325 || .765 || 1.5 || .7 || .3 || .3 || 3.6
|}

 Statistics with the Denver Nuggets.

Standings

Roster

Awards and honors
 Dikembe Mutombo would have his number 55 retired by the team around the start of the Denver Nuggets' season.

Transactions

Trades

Free agents

Signings

Subtractions

References

Denver Nuggets seasons
Denver Nuggets
Denver Nuggets
Denver Nuggets